The Hambletonian Stakes is a major American harness race for three-year-old trotting horses, named in honor of Hambletonian 10, a foundation sire of the Standardbred horse breed, also known as the "Father of the American Trotter."  The first in the Triple Crown of Harness Racing for Trotters, the Hambletonian is currently held at the Meadowlands Racetrack in East Rutherford, New Jersey, on the first Saturday in August.

Sites
The Hambletonian first took place at the New York State Fair in Syracuse in 1926. The race switched from Syracuse to Lexington, Kentucky for the 1927 and 1929 races, however, because of rainouts. Starting in 1930, Good Time Park in Goshen, New York hosted the race until 1956 with the exception of 1943. That year, The Hambletonian was raced at Empire City Race Track, which became Yonkers Raceway in 1950, because of wartime gas rationing. The Du Quoin State Fair in Du Quoin, Illinois gained the rights to host the race in 1957 and held on to it until 1980. Since 1981, the race has been at the Meadowlands Racetrack in East Rutherford, New Jersey.

Records
 Most wins by a driver
 6 – John Campbell (1987, 1988, 1990, 1995, 1998, 2006)

 Most wins by a trainer
 5 – shared by:
 Billy Haughton  (1974, 1976, 1977, 1980, 1982)
 Ben White (1927, 1933, 1936, 1942, 1943)
 Stanley Dancer (1965, 1968, 1972, 1975, 1983)

 Stakes record
 1:50 1/5 – Muscle Hill (2009)

Hambletonian Stakes winners

References

External links
 Sugar Loaf Historical Society
 New Jersey Horse Enthusiast Web

 
Meadowlands Racetrack
Harness races in the United States
Harness races for three-year-old trotters
United States Triple Crown of Harness Racing
Sports in East Rutherford, New Jersey
Recurring sporting events established in 1926
1926 establishments in New York (state)